CB Bahía San Agustín, more commonly known as Palmer Alma Mediterrànea Palma by sponsorship reasons, is a basketball team based in Palma, Spain.

History
The club was created in 2007 after the merge of two clubs in the island, that in previous years agreed collaboration terms:

 CB San Agustín (1972)
 CB Imprenta Bahía (1982)

After resigning to promote to LEB Plata in 2011, the next season promotes again to this league and this time accepts to play this league, the third one in the Spanish basketball league system.

In May 2013, the team promotes to LEB Oro, but decided to continue playing at LEB Plata. One year later, they would be defeated by CB Prat in the promotion playoffs final, but finally promoted to LEB Oro after achieving a vacant berth.

Its women's club promoted to Liga Femenina 2 in 2013 but was relegated to the third tier in 2017.

In 2019, the club played the Final Four for promoting to Liga ACB, but it was defeated in the final by Bilbao Basket.

Sponsorship naming
Palma Playa Park: 2006–2009
Palma Bàsquet: 2009–2010
Platja de Palma: 2010–2012
Palma Air Europa: 2012–2017
Iberostar Palma: 2017–2018
Iberojet Palma: 2018–2019
B the travel brand Mallorca-Palma: 2019–2020
Palmer Alma Mediterrànea Palma: 2020–

Logos

Players

Current roster

Depth chart

Season by season

Notable players

References

External links
Official website

Basketball teams established in 2007
Basketball teams in the Balearic Islands
Former LEB Plata teams
Women's basketball teams in Spain
Sport in Palma de Mallorca
LEB Oro teams
Former Liga EBA teams